Robert Haddin Teasdale (28 June 1891 – 24 June 1953) was an Australian rules footballer who played with Fitzroy in the Victorian Football League (VFL).

Notes

External links 

1891 births
1953 deaths
Australian rules footballers from Western Australia
Fitzroy Football Club players